Angiopoietin-like 3, also known as ANGPTL3, is a protein that in humans is encoded by the ANGPTL3 gene.

Function 

The protein encoded by this gene is a member of the angiopoietin-like family of secreted factors. It is expressed predominantly in the liver, and has the characteristic structure of angiopoietins, consisting of a signal peptide, N-terminal coiled-coil domain, and the C-terminal fibrinogen (FBN)-like domain. The FBN-like domain in angiopoietin-like 3 protein was shown to bind alpha-5/beta-3 integrins, and this binding induced endothelial cell adhesion and migration. This protein may also play a role in the regulation of angiogenesis.

Angptl3 also acts as dual inhibitor of lipoprotein lipase (LPL) and endothelial lipase (EL), thereby increasing plasma triglyceride, LDL cholesterol and HDL cholesterol in mice and humans.

ANGPTL3 inhibits endothelial lipase hydrolysis of HDL-phospholipid (PL), thereby increasing HDL-PL levels. Circulating PL-rich HDL particles have high cholesterol efflux abilities.

Angptl3 plays a major role in promoting uptake of circulating triglycerides into white adipose tissue in the fed state, likely through activation by Angptl8, a feeding-induced hepatokine, to inhibit postprandial LPL activity in cardiac and skeletal muscles, as suggested by the ANGPTL3-4-8 model.

Clinical significance 

In human, ANGPTL3 is a determinant factor of HDL level and positively correlates with plasma HDL cholesterol.

In humans with genetic loss-of-function variants in one copy of ANGPTL3, the serum LDL-C levels are reduced. In those with loss-of-function variants in both copies of ANGPTL3, low LDL-C, low HDL-C, and low triglycerides are seen ("familial combined hypolipidemia").

References

Further reading

External links